Robson Street is a major southeast-northwest thoroughfare in downtown and West End of Vancouver, British Columbia, Canada. Its core commercial blocks from Burrard Street to Jervis were also known as Robsonstrasse. Its name honours John Robson, a major figure in British Columbia's entry into the Canadian Confederation, and Premier of the province from 1889 to 1892. Robson Street starts at BC Place Stadium near the north shore of False Creek, then runs northwest past Vancouver Library Square, Robson Square and the Vancouver Art Gallery, coming to an end at Lost Lagoon in Stanley Park.

As of 2006, the city of Vancouver overall had the fifth most expensive retail rental rates in the world, averaging US$135 per square foot per year, citywide. Robson Street tops Vancouver with its most expensive locations renting for up to US$200 per square foot per year. In 2006, both Robson Street and the Mink Mile on Bloor Street in Toronto were the 22nd most expensive streets in the world, with rents of $208 per square feet. In 2007, the Mink Mile and Robson slipped to 25th in the world with an average of $198 per square feet. The price of each continues to grow with Vancouver being Burberry's first Canadian location and Toronto's Yorkville neighbourhood (which is bounded on the south side by Bloor) now commanding rents of $300 per square foot.

In 1895, train tracks were laid down the street, supporting a concentration of shops and restaurants. From the early to middle-late 20th century, and especially after significant immigration from postwar Germany, the northwest end of Robson Street was known as a centre of German culture and commerce in Vancouver, earning the nickname Robsonstrasse, even among non-Germans (this name lives on in the Robsonstrasse Hotel on the street). At one time, the city had placed streetsigns reading "Robsonstrasse" though these were placed after the German presence in the area had largely vanished.

Robson Street was featured on an old edition of the Canadian Monopoly board as one of the two most expensive properties.

Upscale shopping
Robson Street's role as a consumer district continues to the present day although the original flavour of the street, which was all small neighbourhood-market stores, has been supplanted by massive redevelopment by brand-name chain stores and high-end restaurants. Robson Street is particularly famous for the fashion shops and dining which extends from Granville Street in the southeast to Denman Street in the northwest, with the main concentration centred between Burrard and Bute Streets, which is the area also known historically as Robsonstrasse.

Although not technically on Robson Street but still considered part of the district, the 'Vancouver Luxury Zone' contain the most expensive upscale stores in the city. It is anchored on Alberni Street and Georgia Streets as they intersect Burrard Street .

Robson and Thurlow
Robson street's intersection with Thurlow Street was known for having two Starbucks coffee shops on opposite corners, one of which was non-smoking prior to the enactment of the indoor smoking ban, and the other not. The location on the west corner is known as a major meeting place for the biker culture, with motorcycles parked in a special bikes-only strip of parking painted on the pavement. It was also this corner of Robson and Thurlow that acted as the epicentre of the Stanley Cup Riot of 1994.

Neighbourhoods

There are numerous highrises along or near Robson, many of them condo towers and hotels. The Empire Landmark Hotel, originally the Sheraton Landmark, was the tallest highrise on the strip at 42 storeys. It included the Cloud Nine revolving restaurant.

There are numerous residential condo and apartment towers under construction along the southeastern end of Robson near Yaletown past the bustling Granville Mall, whereas the northwestern end becomes part of Vancouver's West End neighbourhood containing older residential highrises near the quieter Stanley Park and Lost Lagoon; the last few blocks of Robson between Denman and Lost Lagoon are part of the Stanley Park Neighbourhood.

Robson Street is also popular as a cruising street, with many exotic, rare cars and motorcycles present every weekend throughout the summer.

Major intersections

See also
West End, Vancouver (Robson Street passes through the northeast edge of the West End)
Davie Village

References

External links

1964 film footage of Robson Street
Robson Street Business Association

Streets in Vancouver
Shopping districts and streets in Canada
Busking venues
Ethnic enclaves in British Columbia
German communities